The Comfort of Strangers is a 1990  psychological thriller film directed by Paul Schrader, and starring Christopher Walken, Rupert Everett, Natasha Richardson, and Helen Mirren. The screenplay by Harold Pinter was adapted from the 1981 novel of the same name by Ian McEwan.

It was screened out of competition at the 1990 Cannes Film Festival.

Plot
Unmarried English couple Colin and Mary are vacationing in Venice for a second time, in an attempt to rekindle their passionless relationship. As they meander through the city visiting landmarks, they are surreptitiously photographed by a stranger. Over dinner, Mary questions Colin as to whether he likes her two children, whom she conceived during her last marriage. While wandering through the streets, the couple get lost. They encounter Robert, an elegant British-Italian man who offers to take them to his bar. Over several bottles of wine, Robert regales the couple with intimate, bizarre details of his life, including stories about his sadistic father, an Italian diplomat, as well as cruel pranks his younger sisters played on him during his childhood. He also recounts how he met his wife, Caroline, the daughter of a Canadian diplomat. Colin and Mary attempt to return to their hotel after their night with Robert, but become lost. Mary suffers a migraine and the two end up sleeping on the streets.

At dawn, the couple awaken and visit a cafe in the square at St Mark's Basilica. There, Mary expresses unease and wishes to abort their vacation. The two are again met by Robert, who apologizes after learning the couple slept on the street. He offers to have them over for a meal at his home, which they accept. The three are taken by a water taxi to Robert's spacious, Moorish-styled apartment, and the couple take a nap. They awaken and are met by Caroline. She tells them Robert has left to work at his bar, and offers Mary food. As Mary spends time with Caroline, she notices that she appears to have a back injury. Caroline confesses to having looked in on the couple while they were sleeping, and remarks their beauty.

When Robert returns, he continues to unfurl anecdotes about his domineering father and grandfather. When Colin insults Robert in the library, Robert punches him in the stomach. Colin does not tell Mary about the incident. After dinner, Colin and Mary return to their hotel, where they have passionate sex. Later, Mary has a nightmare, and upon waking, admits to Colin that she saw a photograph of him in Robert and Caroline's apartment. While the couple visit the beach later, Colin confesses to Mary how Robert hit him. The two subsequently discuss getting married when they return to England.

While walking through the city, Colin and Mary stumble upon Robert and Caroline's residence by happenstance. Caroline, out on a balcony, notices them, and calls out for them to come and visit. Caroline and Robert inform the couple that they will be leaving the next day to visit Caroline's family in Canada. Robert insists Colin accompany him on a short trip to tend to his bar, to which he agrees. Caroline stays with Mary at the house, and finds the home is mostly packed. Caroline tells Mary that she and Robert plan to sell it when they return. Over tea, Caroline tells Mary her back injury stems from years of sadomasochistic sex that she and Robert engage in. Meanwhile, Robert tells Colin he is selling his bar. Colin asks Robert why he took photographs of him, but Robert continues to steer the conversation toward anecdotes relating to his family.

Mary begins to suffer vertigo, and suspects she has been drugged. She is escorted by Caroline to a bedroom, where she finds the walls covered in photographs of her and (mostly) Colin taken over the course of their vacation. Caroline explains that Robert has been stalking the couple since the day they arrived, having passed them on the street. Robert and Colin return to the house, and Colin is alarmed to find Mary unable to speak. Realizing that he and Mary have been lured there to take part in Robert and Caroline's twisted sex game, Colin attempts to fight the couple off, but they slash his throat with a razor as Mary helplessly watches. As Colin bleeds to death, Robert and Caroline begin to have sex.

Later, Mary is questioned by the Italian police before she goes to view Colin's body. As she is escorted out of the police station, Robert and Caroline are interrogated. As the detectives commence their interview with Robert, he begins telling another story about his father.

Cast

Reception
Upon release, The Comfort of Strangers received generally favorable reviews from critics. It holds a rating of 61% on Metacritic from 20 reviews. Vincent Canby of the New York Times reviewed the film positively, saying "Mr. Schrader is a director of great rigor and discipline. The movie is fascinated by the baroque behavior it observes, but without imitating it." Roger Ebert gave the film a generally positive review, rated it 2.5 stars out of 4, and said:

Peter Travers of Rolling Stone also wrote a generally positive review, commenting that "Schrader is an astute guide through the circuitous byways of sexual manipulation. His hypnotic thriller supplies intelligent pleasures as well as gruesome chills." Slant Magazine gave it 4 stars out of 5, calling it "underrated" in a more recent review.

The film was released in home video by the Criterion Collection in 2020.

References

External links
 
 
 
 
The Comfort of Strangers: Significant Others an essay by Maitland McDonagh at the Criterion Collection

1990 films
1990 drama films
1990s psychological drama films
BDSM in films
British psychological drama films
British psychological thriller films
1990s English-language films
Films about couples
Films about vacationing
Films based on British novels
Films directed by Paul Schrader
Films scored by Angelo Badalamenti
Films set in Venice
Films shot in Venice
Films with screenplays by Harold Pinter
Italian psychological drama films
Italian psychological thriller films
Murder in films
1990s British films